Common name: Pacific gopher snake, coast gopher snake, western gopher snake, more.

Pituophis catenifer is a species of nonvenomous colubrid snake endemic to  North America. Nine subspecies are currently recognized, including the nominotypical subspecies, Pituophis catenifer catenifer, described here. This snake is often mistaken for the prairie rattlesnake, but can be easily distinguished from a rattlesnake by the lack of black and white banding on its tail and by the shape of its head, which is narrower than a rattlesnake's.

Etymology
The specific name, catenifer, is Latin for "chain-bearing", referring to the dorsal color pattern.

Description
Adults are 36-84 in (91–213 cm) in length. Dorsally, they are yellowish or pale brown, with a series of large, dark brown or black blotches, and smaller, dark spots on the sides. Ventrally, they are yellowish, either uniform or with brown markings. They also come in several morphs depending on the subspecies.

Behavior

The gopher snake has a unique defensive mechanism, in which it puffs up its body and curls itself into the classic strike pose of a rattlesnake. However, rather than delivering an open-mouthed strike, the gopher snake often strikes with a closed mouth, using its blunt nose to "warn off" possible predators. Additionally, gopher snakes vibrate their tails in a manner similar to rattlesnakes. One paper found that gopher snakes on islands lacking rattlesnakes vibrate their tails for shorter amounts of time than gopher snakes in mainland California, which is home to numerous rattlesnake species. This suggests that gopher snake tail vibration may in fact be rattlesnake mimicry since the behavior appears to be breaking down in areas without rattlesnakes, perhaps because predators on these islands have no reason to evolve to avoid tail-vibrating snakes (rattlesnakes are venomous, gopher snakes are not).

Life expectancy
Wild gopher snakes typically live 12 to 15 years, but the oldest captive recorded lived over 33 years.

Common names
Common names for this species, or its several subspecies, are: Pacific gopher snake, Henry snake, coast gopher snake, bullsnake, Churchill's bullsnake, Oregon bullsnake, Pacific pine snake, western bullsnake, western gopher snake, Sonoran gopher snake, western pine snake, great basin gopher snake, blow snake, and yellow gopher snake.

Subspecies
As of 2022, there is largely agreement on the recognition of six subspecies occurring in Canada, USA, and mainland Mexico. However, there is not agreement among taxonomist on status of populations from Baja California and adjacent islands. The Cape gophersnake (Pituophis catenifer vertebralis) and Central Baja California gophersnake (Pituophis catenifer bimaris) are recognized by some as single species with no subspecies Pituophis vertebralis, or as a species with two subspecies Pituophis v. vertebralis and P. v. bimaris by others. Other subspecies including the Coronado Island gophersnake (Pituophis catenifer coronalis) and San Martin Island gophersnake (Pituophis catenifer fulginatus) are of questionable validity.

Gallery

References

Further reading
 Blainville, H.D. 1835. Description de quelques espèces de reptiles de la Californie précédée de l'analyse d'un système général d'herpétologie et d'amphibiologie. Nouvelles Annales du Muséum d'Histoire Naturelle 4: 233-296. (Coluber catenifer, pp. 290–291 + Plate XXVI., Figures 2, 2A, 2B.)

External links

 

catenifer
Snakes of North America
Reptiles of Mexico
Reptiles of the United States
Fauna of the Western United States
Fauna of Northern Mexico
Fauna of California
Fauna of the California chaparral and woodlands
Fauna of the San Francisco Bay Area
Reptiles described in 1835
Taxa named by Henri Marie Ducrotay de Blainville